Beru Airport  is the airport serving Beru Island. The island is located in the Kingsmill Group of the South Gilbert Islands in the Pacific Ocean and is part of the Republic of Kiribati.

The airport is located in the south of the island and is served by Air Kiribati and Coral Sun Airways, each of them featuring a small range of domestic destinations from Beru.

Airlines and destinations

Sources
Translated from the German Wiki (2 Feb 2009)

Airports in Kiribati